The participation of Israel in the Junior Eurovision Song Contest first began in Amsterdam, Netherlands, at the Junior Eurovision Song Contest 2012. The first representative to participate for the nation was Kids.il with the song "Let the Music Win", which finished in eighth place out of twelve participating entries, achieving a score of 68 points. Israel did not return to the contest in 2013, and also sat out of the 2014 and 2015 contests. However, following their success at the 2015 and 2016 Eurovision Song Contests, the IBA expressed an interest in making a return to competing at Junior Eurovision. Israel returned to the contest in 2016, with their entrant being selected internally.

History

IBA internally selected a sextet group consisting of members Adel Korshov, Adi Bity, Adi Mesilati, Daniel Pruzansky, Libi Panker, and Tali Sorokin. The group who were known by their band name Kids.il, performed the song "Let the Music Win", which finished in eighth place achieving a score of sixty-eight points.

On 21 October 2013, IBA announced their withdrawal from the 2013 contest. However, no details were published as to provide reasons for their withdrawal. On 28 September 2016, Israel's participation was officially confirmed by the EBU. On 25 July 2018 it was announced that Israel would return in the 2018 contest, following a change in the contest rules to allow more than 18 countries to participate. The country was given special dispensation by the host broadcaster BTRC and the EBU as they had won the adult contest earlier that year.

Participation overview

Commentators and spokespersons

The contests are broadcast online worldwide through the official Junior Eurovision Song Contest website junioreurovision.tv and YouTube. In 2015, the online broadcasts featured commentary in English by junioreurovision.tv editor Luke Fisher and 2011 Bulgarian Junior Eurovision Song Contest entrant Ivan Ivanov. The Israeli broadcaster, IBA, never sent their own commentator to the 2012 contest. However, a spokesperson was chosen in order to announce the awarding points from Israel. The table below list the details of each commentator and spokesperson since 2012.

See also
Israel in the Eurovision Song Contest – Senior version of the Junior Eurovision Song Contest.
Israel in the Eurovision Young Musicians – A competition organised by the EBU for musicians aged 18 years and younger.

Notes and references

Notes

References

Countries in the Junior Eurovision Song Contest